Pseudaptinus is a genus of beetles in the family Carabidae, containing the following species:

 Pseudaptinus albicornis (Klug, 1834) 
 Pseudaptinus australis (Blackburn, 1889) 
 Pseudaptinus borgmeieri Liebke, 1939 
 Pseudaptinus brittoni Baehr, 1985 
 Pseudaptinus championi Liebke, 1934 
 Pseudaptinus cribratus Liebke, 1934 
 Pseudaptinus cyclophthalmus Baehr, 1985 
 Pseudaptinus depressipennis Baehr, 1995 
 Pseudaptinus elegans Chaudoir, 1862 
 Pseudaptinus fulvus (Castelnau, 1867) 
 Pseudaptinus hirsutulus Baehr, 1985 
 Pseudaptinus insularis Mutchler, 1934
 Pseudaptinus iridescens Baehr, 1985 
 Pseudaptinus lecontei (Dejean, 1831) 
 Pseudaptinus leprieuri (Buquet, 1835) 
 Pseudaptinus magicus Liebke, 1934 
 Pseudaptinus mimicus Liebke, 1934 
 Pseudaptinus monteithi Baehr, 1985 
 Pseudaptinus nevermanni Liebke, 1936 
 Pseudaptinus ohausi Liebke, 1934 
 Pseudaptinus oviceps Vandyke, 1926 
 Pseudaptinus punctatostriatus Baehr, 1985
 Pseudaptinus punctatus Liebke, 1934 
 Pseudaptinus salebrosus Liebke, 1934 
 Pseudaptinus subfasciatus Chaudoir, 1862 
 Pseudaptinus tenuicollis (Leconte, 1851) 
 Pseudaptinus thaxteri Darlington, 1934

References

Dryptinae